Hol is a former municipality in Nordland county, Norway. The  municipality existed from 1919 until its dissolution in 1963. Hol was located on the island of Vestvågøya in the southeastern part of what is now Vestvågøy Municipality.  The administrative centre was located in Stamsund.  The main church for Hol was Hol Church which is located just outside of the village of Fygle.

History
The municipality of Hol was established on 1 July 1919 when the eastern part of Buksnes municipality was split off to become the new municipality.  Initially, Hol had a population of 2,272.  During the 1960s, there were many municipal mergers across Norway due to the work of the Schei Committee.  On 1 January 1963, the municipality of Hol (population: 3,154) was merged with the neighboring municipalities of Borge (population: 4,056), Buksnes (population: 4,416), and Valberg (population: 662) to create the new Vestvågøy Municipality.

Name
The municipality (originally the parish) is named after the old Hol farm since the first Hol Church was built there. The name is derived from the word  which means "round hill".

Government
While it existed, this municipality was responsible for primary education (through 10th grade), outpatient health services, senior citizen services, unemployment, social services, zoning, economic development, and municipal roads. During its existence, this municipality was governed by a municipal council of elected representatives, which in turn elected a mayor.

Municipal council
The municipal council  of Hol was made up of 17 representatives that were elected to four year terms.  The party breakdown of the final municipal council was as follows:

Mayors
The mayors of Hol:

 1919-1919: Andreas Tetlie 
 1920-1922: Ingvald Martin Johansen 
 1923-1925: Andreas Tetlie
 1926-1931: Johan Dreier Pettersen 
 1932-1934: Mathias J. Waldahl
 1935-1937: Ole Gottlin Johan Lauvdal
 1938-1941: Jarle Holst Try
 1941-1945: Ole Martin Johansen 	
 1945-1945: Arne Rasmussen 	
 1946-1946: Martin J. Hol 
 1946-1959: Karl Leirfall 
 1960-1962: Walter Tjønndal

Media gallery

See also
List of former municipalities of Norway

References

Vestvågøy
Former municipalities of Norway
1919 establishments in Norway
1963 disestablishments in Norway